Kushal (also Romanized as Kūshāl) is a village in Layalestan Rural District, in the Central District of Lahijan County, Gilan Province, Iran. At the 2006 census, its population was 669, in 234 families.

References 

Populated places in Lahijan County